Louis Niñé (December 18, 1922 – March 14, 1983) was an American politician from New York.

Life
Louis Niñé (the surname is pronounced neen-YAY) was born on December 18, 1922, in Mayagüez, Puerto Rico. There he attended grammar school and high school. During World War II he served in the United States Army. He graduated B.S. from Fordham University in 1950. He worked for the New York City Social Services, and then for the New York State Department of Labor, and entered politics as a Democrat. Later he engaged in the real estate and insurance business. He married Jutta Bock, and they had two children, Anna and Joseph.

He was a member of the New York State Assembly from 1971 until his death in 1983, sitting in the 179th, 180th, 181st, 182nd, 183rd, 184th and 185th New York State Legislatures. He was Chairman of the Democratic Assembly Conference from 1976 to 1980. In 1978, he ran on the Democratic and Conservative tickets in the special election to fill the vacancy in Congress caused by the resignation of Herman Badillo. In the Democratic primary he defeated State Senator Robert García, but in the special election Niñé was defeated by Garcia who ran on the Republican and Liberal tickets.

Niñé died on March 14, 1983, at his home in the Bronx, of cancer.

Louis Niñé Boulevard (formerly Wilkins Av), in Crotona Park East, Bronx, was named in his honor in 1985.

References

1922 births
1983 deaths
American politicians of Puerto Rican descent
Fordham University alumni
Hispanic and Latino American state legislators in New York (state)
People from Mayagüez, Puerto Rico
Democratic Party members of the New York State Assembly
20th-century American politicians
Politicians from the Bronx
United States Army personnel of World War II
United States Army soldiers